John Sneddon (1867 – unknown) was a Scottish professional footballer who played as a forward.

He played for Hearts (5 appearances and 2 goals in Scottish Cup), Accrington (1 appearance in 1890–91 season) and Newton Heath. He scored the first goal ever in a Manchester derby vs Ardwick on 3 October 1891. He played in 3 FA Cup matches (scoring 1 goal) and in 21 Alliance matches (scoring 6 goals) for Newton Heath.

References

External links
MUFCInfo.com profile

1867 births
Year of death missing
Scottish footballers
Association football forwards
Heart of Midlothian F.C. players
Accrington F.C. players
Manchester United F.C. players